Ramin Ibrahimov (born 2 July 1978) is a visually impaired Paralympic judoka of Azerbaijan. In 2011 he received the Tereggi Medal by the Azerbaijani President. At the 2012 Summer Paralympics he won a gold medal.

References 

1978 births
Living people
Place of birth missing (living people)
Azerbaijani male judoka
Paralympic judoka of Azerbaijan
Paralympic gold medalists for Azerbaijan
Paralympic bronze medalists for Azerbaijan
Judoka at the 2008 Summer Paralympics
Judoka at the 2012 Summer Paralympics
Medalists at the 2008 Summer Paralympics
Medalists at the 2012 Summer Paralympics
Recipients of the Tereggi Medal
Paralympic medalists in judo
21st-century Azerbaijani people